The Incomati chiselmouth (Labeobarbus nelspruitensis) is a species of ray-finned fish in the genus Labeobarbus which is endemic to the Incomati and Pongolo river systems in Mozambique and South Africa.

References 

 

nelspruitensis
Fish described in 1911